Manan  is a village in Kapurthala district of Punjab State, India. The village is administrated by a Sarpanch who is an elected representative.

Demography 
According to the 2011 Census of India, Manan had 113 houses with a total population of 585 persons, of which 268 were male and 317 females. The Literacy rate was 69.31%, lower than the state average of 75.84%.  The population of children in the age group 0–6 years was 67, being 11.45% of the total population.  The child sex ratio was approximately 1310, higher than the state average of 846.

Population data

References

External links 
  Villages in Kapurthala
 Kapurthala Villages List

Villages in Kapurthala district